Colorado Rapids Women is an American women's soccer team, founded in 1996. The team is a member of the women's premier soccer league and plays in the Central Conference's Mountain Region. The team was a member of the United Soccer Leagues W-League, the second highest tier of women's soccer in the United States and Canada. The team played in the Western Conference against the Colorado Rush, LA Strikers, Pali Blues, Santa Clarita Blue Heat, Seattle Sounders Women,  and Bay Area Breeze.

The team played its home games at Stermole Soccer Stadium in the city of Golden, Colorado. The club's colors are Burgundy, Sky Blue, and White.

On July 23, 2012 the Colorado Rapids Women won the North American USL Super20 League championship staged at the IMG Academy in Bradenton, Florida. They defeated D.C. United Super20 1-0 in the Final crowning the Rapids Super20 North American Champions for 2012.

In their inaugural 2019 WPSL Season, the Rapids Women placed 2nd in the Central Region's Mountain Conference with a record of 8-2-0.

Players

Current roster
(As of July 2019)

Coaching staff

Previous Head coaches
  Daniel Clitnovici (2012-2014)

Year-by-year

References

External links
Colorado Rapids Women
  Colorado Rapids Women on USL Soccer
Colorado Rapids Women WPSL Expansion

Women's soccer clubs in Colorado
Soccer clubs in Colorado
USL W-League (1995–2015) teams
1996 establishments in Colorado
Colorado Rapids
Association football clubs established in 1996